Bemvindo Sequeira (born July 27, 1947) is a Brazilian actor, comedian, author, theater, and television director.

Filmography

Television

Cine

teatro

References

External links 
 
Bemvindo Sequeira's official Facebook page

1947 births
Living people
Brazilian male actors
Brazilian male comedians
Brazilian theatre directors
Brazilian television directors